Elections to Lisburn Borough Council were held on 30 May 1973 on the same day as the other Northern Irish local government elections. The election used five district electoral areas to elect a total of 23 councillors.

Election results

Districts summary

|- class="unsortable" align="centre"
!rowspan=2 align="left"|Ward
! % 
!Cllrs
! % 
!Cllrs
! % 
!Cllrs
! %
!Cllrs
! % 
!Cllrs
! %
!Cllrs
!rowspan=2|TotalCllrs
|- class="unsortable" align="center"
!colspan=2 bgcolor="" | UUP
!colspan=2 bgcolor="" | DUP
!colspan=2 bgcolor="" | Alliance
!colspan=2 bgcolor="" | Vanguard
!colspan=2 bgcolor="" | SDLP
!colspan=2 bgcolor="white"| Others
|-
|align="left"|Area A
|bgcolor="40BFF5"|52.7
|bgcolor="40BFF5"|3
|16.5
|0
|8.5
|0
|0.0
|0
|17.8
|1
|4.5
|0
|4
|-
|align="left"|Area B
|bgcolor="40BFF5"|57.1
|bgcolor="40BFF5"|4
|19.5
|1
|13.4
|0
|10.0
|0
|0.0
|0
|0.0
|0
|5
|-
|align="left"|Area C
|bgcolor="40BFF5"|38.3
|bgcolor="40BFF5"|2
|20.4
|1
|12.9
|1
|13.2
|1
|6.2
|0
|9.0
|0
|5
|-
|align="left"|Area D
|bgcolor="40BFF5"|50.9
|bgcolor="40BFF5"|3
|10.7
|1
|24.8
|1
|7.2
|0
|5.0
|0
|1.4
|0
|5
|-
|align="left"|Area E
|bgcolor="40BFF5"|48.5
|bgcolor="40BFF5"|2
|18.7
|1
|26.2
|1
|0.0
|0
|0.0
|0
|6.6
|0
|4
|-
|- class="unsortable" class="sortbottom" style="background:#C9C9C9"
|align="left"| Total
|48.9
|14
|16.8
|4
|18.1
|3
|6.6
|1
|5.3
|1
|4.3
|0
|23
|-
|}

Districts results

Area A

1973: 3 x UUP, 1 x SDLP

Area B

1973: 4 x UUP, 1 x DUP

Area C

1973: 2 x UUP, 1 x DUP, 1 x Alliance, 1 x Vanguard

Area D

1973: 3 x UUP, 1 x DUP, 1 x Alliance

Area E

1973: 2 x UUP, 1 x Alliance, 1 x DUP

References

Lisburn City Council elections
Lisburn